John Stewart (February 10, 1795 – September 16, 1860) was a U.S. Representative from Connecticut.

Born in Chatham, Connecticut, Stewart completed preparatory studies. He became engaged in shipbuilding and in the mercantile business in Middle Haddam. He served as member of the Connecticut House of Representatives in 1830, and in the Connecticut State Senate from 1832 to 1837. He served as judge of the county court of Middletown, in Middlesex County, Connecticut.

Stewart was elected as a Democrat to the Twenty-eighth Congress, serving from March 4, 1843 to March 3, 1845. He was an unsuccessful candidate for reelection in 1844, to the Twenty-ninth Congress. He thereafter resumed shipbuilding pursuits, serving in the state senate again in 1846, and in the state house of representatives again in 1854.

He died in Chatham, Connecticut, and was interred in Union Hill Cemetery at Middle Haddam, Chatham, Connecticut.

References

External links

 

1795 births
1860 deaths
Democratic Party members of the Connecticut House of Representatives
Democratic Party Connecticut state senators
Connecticut state court judges
Democratic Party members of the United States House of Representatives from Connecticut
19th-century American politicians
19th-century American judges